FDR and the Jews is a 2013 book by Richard Breitman and Allan J. Lichtman examining the complex relationship between Franklin D. Roosevelt and Jews.

The book won the National Jewish Book Award in 2013.

See also 
 Report to the Secretary on the Acquiescence of This Government in the Murder of the Jews
 War Refugee Board

References 

2013 non-fiction books
Books about Franklin D. Roosevelt
History books about Jews and Judaism
Belknap Press books